Return of the Living Dead: Necropolis is a 2005 made-for-television action horror film directed by Ellory Elkayem, starring Aimee Lynn Chadwick, Cory Hardrict, John Keefe, Jana Kramer, and Peter Coyote. It is the fourth film in the Return of the Living Dead film series.

Plot

Set 10 years after the events of Return of the Living Dead 3, the film starts with Charles Garrison traveling to Chernobyl, Ukraine (site of the 1986 Chernobyl nuclear disaster) to collect the last six canisters of Trioxin 5. Two Russian sellers take him to an empty power station which contains the Trioxin. One of the Russians gets Trioxin on his hands, turning him into a zombie. Upon hearing screams, Garrison runs to see the zombie eating the other Russian partner. Garrison promptly shoots the zombie in the head.

It is then revealed Julian and Jake "Pyro" Garrison, Charles's nephews, were living with him since their parents were volunteers who died a year earlier at Hybra Tech. Julian spends a day at school while Charles experiments with the Trioxin, reanimating an arm. The next day, Julian leaves the house to go motorbiking with his friends, Cody, Becky, Carlos, Zeke, and Darren. During a stunt, Zeke falls and gets knocked unconscious.

Meanwhile, Charles is experimenting with the Trioxin. He manages to reanimate a corpse, and feeds it brains to keep it docile. However, some of the gas manages to escape through the pipes into one of the lower levels of the building and reanimates a dead rat that two homeless men, Crusty and Joey, were eating and it proceeds to attack them. During this, Julian travels to the hospital he was told Zeke would be taken to, and was told by a doctor that Zeke had an unexplained reaction to the painkillers and was pronounced dead on arrival.

Meanwhile, one of Julian’s other friends, Katie, Zeke's ex-girlfriend, was working security at Hybra Tech and noticed Zeke being brought in. She informed the others, and Cody hacked into the Hybra Tech website, where they discovered that Zeke was going to be used as a test subject, so they decided to break in and rescue him.

They manage to get into Hybra Tech using fake IDs, with Katie at the security center giving them advice over walkie-talkies. At the same time, their promiscuous friend, Mimi, distracts her partner, Hector. Along the way, Carlos dispatches the zombified Crusty and Joey with a gun he had brought.

They sneak through the ventilation shaft and find out that Jake has followed them inside. They get out of the vent and find themselves in an armory. After some searching they are found pretty quickly by Charles, who reluctantly agrees to show them where Zeke is.

Charles, at gunpoint, leads them through the facility hallways, where they discover holding cells full of zombies. They manage to find Zeke in a holding cell. Carlos shoots the lock, allowing them to free Zeke, but also setting off an alarm that Katie tries to deactivate.

Cody then leads them into a room of zombie clones in test tubes, and Charles explains that they are to be the new test subjects. At Cody and Carlos' insistence, Charles also reveals that Julian’s parents are alive and being tested on there, before they get distracted by a live test tube zombie. He uses the distraction to escape and lock them in the room.

Katie manages to deactivate the alarm, but Carlos shoots the panel to escape the room, causing it to turn on again. This time, when Katie tries to turn off the alarm, it causes a security failure that releases all the zombies in the complex. Darren gets the back of his head eaten during the chaos, and Zeke is bitten on the neck by a zombie before they reach the armory. They grab some guns for defense and climb back into the vents to escape.

Katie learns of the outbreak through the monitors she is watching, and goes off to find Mimi and Hector so they can escape. While going through the vents, a zombie breaks the floor out, separating Julian, Carlos, and Cody from Zeke, Becky, and Jake. The three of them go off to find a car to escape in while Julian, Carlos, and Cody resolve to try to find Julian’s parents.

Katie finds Mimi and Hector and tries to get them to escape, but the two of them are swarmed by zombies, forcing her to leave them behind. Julian, Cody, and Carlos reach the building where Julian's parents are being held, fighting through the zombies in their way. When they run out of ammo, they are forced to go hand-to-hand with the zombies, and successfully dispatch the remaining zombies in their way. However, when the three are running for the elevator, Carlos takes too long dispatching his zombie. Another one pops out before he can get into the elevator, and Julian and Cody watch in horror as his head is eaten while the elevator doors close.

Meanwhile, Zeke, Becky, and Pyro manage to make it to the parking lot and are able to find keys to a jeep. Zeke empties his rifle before joining them in the jeep, and Becky takes out a zombie that had grabbed Jake by shocking them both with a stun gun she had brought. During all of this, Zeke is in the process of turning.

As they are driving down the road to escape, Zeke completes his transformation into a zombie and tries to eat them, causing them to crash; he retains his mind, but is driven by zombie instincts, the craving for brains.

Julian and Cody, meanwhile, go through the hallways of the facility until they find the lab where Julian's parents are kept. They find Julian's parents turned into zombies in holding tanks, and sees they have been suited up, Julian's mom with circular saws and Julian's dad with wrist-mounted mini-guns to become "uber-soldiers." At Cody's insistence, Julian reluctantly agrees to leave the room, and they get chased by zombies up to the roof. A few minutes later, Charles appears in the room with Julian’s parents and releases them from their tanks.

Julian and Cody manage to rappel down the building where, at the bottom, they encounter the zombified Mimi and Hector. Julian picks up a dead security guard's gun and tries to shoot them, but the gun turns out to be empty. Luckily for them, Katie appears in a new truck and runs the zombies over. Julian and Cody then get in the truck and they go off to find the others.

Meanwhile, Jack and Becky have gotten out of the jeep and are fending off zombies; Jake with a homemade flamethrower, and Becky with a handgun. Zeke runs towards Becky, but Jake pushes her out of the way, and has the back of his head eaten instead.

Becky punches Zeke in the face then sets him on fire with Jake's flamethrower, scaring him away. She holds off zombies with the flamethrower just before Katie arrives in the truck. They pick up Becky, and Julian reluctantly leaves behind his dead brother as they try to escape the zombies.

As they drive down the road, Julian’s dad appears and shoots the truck with the mini-gun, taking it out. After he has finished shooting, Becky gets out of the truck and throws a grenade at him, nearly destroying him. They all get out of the truck and start running, not noticing the mini-guns were still active.

They make it down the road, but encounter Zeke, who accuses Julian of making out with Katie. He then shows that Julian’s mom was there to help him take them out. Zeke starts a fistfight with Julian, while Cody and Becky dodge Julian's mom's attacks. Becky leads Julian's mom towards a power cable, where she drives the saw into the cable, electrocuting her to death. Julian, meanwhile, was losing the fistfight against Zeke who cannot feel pain, who then threw him onto the ground. Julian then revealed that he had pulled the pin to the grenade in Zeke's pocket, which blows Zeke up. Katie comforts Julian on the ground as, down the road, the remaining zombies exit the front doors of the facility.

The SWAT team arrives and shoots down the remaining horde, while also rescuing the four survivors of the group. Unfortunately, Julian’s dad reveals that he's still alive by shooting towards them with his remaining mini-gun. The SWAT team blows up Julian's dad with a tank, but it is then revealed that the zombie had hit Katie with its shots. Cody and Becky are escorted into cars while Katie dies in Julian's arms, and the full weight of everything that just happened crashes onto him, causing him to start crying.

The movie ends with the SWAT team disposing of the bodies, and Charles escaping with the barrels of Trioxin. The closing scene of the movie shows a newscaster reporting about a supposed zombie outbreak, which Hybra Tech denies. In the end, the newscaster is attacked by a zombie as the screen goes black.

Cast
 Aimee-Lynn Chadwick as Becky Carlton
 Cory Hardrict as Cody
 John Keefe as Julian Garrison
 Jana Kramer as Katie Williams
 Peter Coyote as Uncle Charles
 Elvin Dandel as Zeke Borden
 Alexandru Geoana as Jake Garrison
 Toma Danila as Carlos
 Diana Munteanu as Mimi Romero
 Serban Georgevici as Hector
 Gelu Nitu as Boris
 Claudiu Trandafir as Nicholai
 Boris Petroff as "Crusty"
 Constantin Barbulescu as Joey
 Răzvan Oprea as Darren
 Dan Astileanu as Garcia
 Lorena Lupu as Genie
 Esther Nathalie as Ms. Rayburn

Reception
The film was called "the worst cinematic atrocity to wound your retinas" in Rue Morgue's 2006 year in review. Bloody Disgusting was a slightly more positive, "It might seem like Necropolis offers nothing special to the viewer but the film still suggests a simpler time in Sci-fi and Horror, when a few gruesome effects, a cheap script job, and a cast of pretty-but-bland stereotypes could make a Friday night schlockfest seem like the best time ever. If for nothing else, Necropolis deserves a mountain of credit for giving it the old college try."

References

External links

2005 films
2005 horror films
2005 television films
2000s science fiction horror films
American sequel films
Television sequel films
Films set in Chernobyl (city)
Films directed by Ellory Elkayem
Return of the Living Dead (film series)
Syfy original films
American horror television films
American drama television films
2000s American films